Banauli  is a Village or Ward No. 07 in Pipra Rural Municipality of Mahottari District in the Province No.2 (Mithila Pradesh) of south-eastern Nepal. At the time of the 2011 Nepal census it had a population of 4577 people living in 944 individual households. It is very near Thakurpati and Jankpurdham city

Major inhabitants
Here the major inhabitants are Maithil Brahmins, Bhumihar, Dhanuk, Shahu, Lohar, Mukhiya, Das etc.

Formerly this Village was under Banauli-Donauli Village Development Committee of Mahottari district however after the provincial distribution of the country, it lies in Pipara Rural Municipality of Mahottari district in  Madhesh Pradesh
Banauli is also considered as the place where great Maithili Poet Vidyapati lived around twelve years and hence it holds great historical significance. This village lies 4 km south of Janakpurdham.

Gallery 

 Kali Mandir
 Yogeshwarnath Mahadev Mandir

References

External links
UN map of the municipalities of Mahottari District

Populated places in Mahottari District